Elm Mills Township is a township in Barber County, Kansas, USA.  As of the 2000 census, its population was 106.

Geography
According to the USGS, it contains one cemetery, Isabel.

The streams of Crooked Creek, North Elm Creek and South Elm Creek run through this township.

References
 USGS Geographic Names Information System (GNIS)

External links
 City-Data.com

Townships in Barber County, Kansas
Townships in Kansas